TDX most often refers to Tanadgusix Corporation, a shareholder-owned Aleut Alaska Native village corporation.

TDX may refer to:

 TDX Group, now owned by Equifax
 Theta Delta Chi, an International Fraternal Organization
 Trat Airport (IATA: TDX), Trat, Thailand
 An Intel chipset
 A prototype for the TD-2 microwave relay system developed by Bell Labs